The Abraham Iris was a two-seat touring airplane produced in France in the early 1930s in two slightly different versions, the Iris I with a 75 kW (100 hp) Hispano-Suiza piston engine, and the Iris II with a Renault engine. The Iris was a conventional parasol wing monoplane with a neatly faired-in engine.

Specifications (Iris II)

References

External links
 

Single-engined tractor aircraft
Parasol-wing aircraft
1930s French civil utility aircraft
Abraham aircraft